Mitti Cafe is a chain of cafés in India that are completely managed by adults with physical, intellectual and psychiatric disabilities.

History 
Mitti Cafe was founded by Alina Alam in 2017. Since then, Mitti Café has expanded to 16 operational cafes. MITTI Café focuses on training and employing adults with physical, mental and psychiatric disabilities, especially from economically deprived backgrounds, in the hospitality sector.

During the Covid-19 pandemic, Mitti Cafe served over 2 million meals to the poor and vulnerable communities and homeless groups.

Mitti Cafe has won several awards including BMW Group Intercultural Innovation Award, SIF-Deutsche Bank's Made for Good Award, and Bumble Grant.

References 

Food- and drink-related organizations
2017 establishments in India